Carl Frederik Albert Christensen (16 January 1872 – 24 November 1942) was a Danish systematic botanist. He graduated in natural history from the University of Copenhagen under professor Eugenius Warming. He was then a school teacher in Copenhagen, and later superintendent at the Botanical Museum. He was a specialist in ferns and published a catalogue of the World's Pteridophytes, Index Filicum. In addition, he authored a three-volume work on the history of botany in Denmark.

Selected scientific works
 Christensen, Carl (1905–06) Index Filicum. 744 s. Index Filicum Supplementum I-III (1913–17). Reprint 1973 by Koeltz Antiquariat.
 Christensen, Carl (1924-1926) Den danske botaniks historie med tilhørende Bibliografi. København, H. Hagerups Forlag. Three vols. 680 s.

References
 

1872 births
1942 deaths

20th-century Danish botanists
Danish science writers
Pteridologists
19th-century Danish botanists